Plainsman and the Lady is a 1946 American Western film directed by Joseph Kane and written by Richard Wormser. The film stars Wild Bill Elliott, Vera Ralston, Gail Patrick, Joseph Schildkraut, Andy Clyde and Don "Red" Barry. It was released on November 11, 1946 by Republic Pictures.

Plot

Cast  
Wild Bill Elliott as Sam Colton
Vera Ralston as Ann Arnesen
Gail Patrick as Cathy Arnesen
Joseph Schildkraut as Peter Marquette
Andy Clyde as Durango
Don "Red" Barry as Feisty 
Raymond Walburn as Judge Winters
Reinhold Schünzel as Michael H. Arnesen 
Russell Hicks as Sen. Gwin
William B. Davidson as Mr. Russell
Paul Hurst as Al
Charles Judels as Manuel Lopez
Byron Foulger as Mr. Simmons
Jack Lambert as Sival
Hal Taliaferro as Pete
Stuart Hamblen as Matt
Noble Johnson as Wassao
Eva Puig as Anita Lopez

References

External links 
 

1946 films
American Western (genre) films
1946 Western (genre) films
Republic Pictures films
Films directed by Joseph Kane
Films scored by George Antheil
American black-and-white films
1940s English-language films
1940s American films